The Mark 45 anti-submarine torpedo, a.k.a. ASTOR, was a submarine-launched wire-guided nuclear torpedo designed by the United States Navy for use against high-speed, deep-diving, enemy submarines. This was one of several weapons recommended for implementation by Project Nobska, a 1956 summer study on submarine warfare. The -diameter torpedo was fitted with a W34 nuclear warhead. The need to maintain direct control over the warhead meant that a wire connection had to be maintained between the torpedo and submarine until detonation. Wire guidance systems were piggybacked onto this cable, and the torpedo had no homing capability. The design was completed in 1960, and 600 torpedoes were built between 1963 and 1976, when ASTOR was replaced by the Mark 48 torpedo.

Design

The W34 nuclear warhead used in ASTOR had an explosive yield of 11 kilotons. The requirement for positive control of nuclear warheads meant that ASTOR could only be detonated by a deliberate signal from the firing submarine, which necessitated a wire link. Because of this, the torpedo was only fitted with wire guidance systems (transmitted over the same link), and had no homing capability. By replacing the nuclear warhead and removing the wire guidance systems, the torpedo could be reconfigured for unguided launch against surface targets.

History

Production of ASTOR began in 1959 and it entered service soon after. Approximately 600 torpedoes were built by 1976, when the torpedo was replaced by the Mark 48 torpedo. The ASTORs were collected, fitted with conventional warheads and wake homing guidance systems, then sold to foreign navies as the Mark 45 Mod 1 Freedom Torpedo.

See also

American 21 inch torpedo

Notes

References

 
 

Torpedoes of the United States
Nuclear weapons of the United States
Cold War anti-submarine weapons of the United States